The Parisian Agency: Exclusive Properties is a French reality television series. It follows the Boulogne-based Kretz family with "ordinary" origins and their independent luxury real estate agency Kretz & Partners. It first premiered on 24 September 2020 on TMC (part of TF1) in France and Monaco. Internationally, it was released as a Netflix Original on 23 June 2021.

Cast
 Olivier Kretz, the father
 Sandrine Kretz, the mother
 Martin Kretz, the eldest son
 Valentin Kretz, the second eldest son
 Louis Kretz, the second youngest son
 Raphaël Kretz, the youngest son
 Majo, the grandmother

Episodes

Series Overview

Season 1 (2020)

Season 2 (2022)

Production
The Kretz family were approached by Hugo Jaguenau with the idea of developing a television series. It is produced by Réservoir Prod. Principal photography took place over the course of six months.

Netflix will co-produce the second season.

References

External links
L'Agence on TF1
The Parisian Agency: Exclusive Properties on Netflix 

2020 French television series debuts
French-language Netflix original programming
French reality television series
Property buying television shows
Television shows set in Paris